The Nová Paka Brewery is a brewery in the town of Nová Paka, in the Czech Republic.

Beer
BrouCzech is a brand name for a range of beers made by Nová Paka.

The list includes:
 Brouček
 Kryštof
 Kumburak
 Granát
 Podkrkonošský speciál
 Podkrkonošský speciál tmavý (dark)
 Valdštejn
 Hemp Valley Beer
 BrouCzech beer

External links 
 https://web.archive.org/web/20160303210026/http://www.novopackepivo.cz/
 http://www.brouczech.com/
RateBeer

Breweries in the Czech Republic
Jičín District